Sokół Aleksandrów Łódzki is a professional football club based in Poland. They compete in the IV liga, the 5th tier of the Polish football league system. The club was relegated from the 2021–22 III liga.

External links
 

Football clubs in Łódź Voivodeship